Jovana Stoiljković (born 30 September 1988) is a Serbian handball player for Chambray Touraine Handball and the Serbian national team.

References

External links

1988 births
Living people
Serbian female handball players
Sportspeople from Leskovac
Serbian expatriate sportspeople in France
Expatriate handball players
Mediterranean Games gold medalists for Serbia
Competitors at the 2013 Mediterranean Games
Mediterranean Games medalists in handball